The Eparchy of Great Britain is the sole Syro-Malabar Catholic Church ecclesiastical territory or eparchy of the Catholic Church in Great Britain. Its cathedral is Syro-Malabar Cathedral of St Alphonsa in the episcopal see of Preston, Lancashire.
This eparchy is not part of any ecclesiastical province and is exempt immediately to the Major Archbishop of Syro-Malabar Church and the Congregation for the Oriental Churches. It has jurisdiction over Syro-Malabar Catholics in the entirety of Great Britain: England, Scotland and Wales (the United Kingdom minus Northern Ireland). Most of the members of the church are British Indians with heritage in Kerala, where the Syro-Malabar Church is based.

The British eparchy, established in 2016, is the church's fourth diocesan jurisdiction outside India, after the eparchies of Mississauga (Canada), Chicago (US) and Melbourne (Australia). The Syro-Malabar Catholic Church also has an Apostolic Visitor for Europe based in Rome, Bishop Mar Stephen Chirapanath who oversee and liaison the pastoral missions and mass centres in other parts of Europe including Northern Ireland.

Location and structure
It has chaplains (mostly Indian) in territory overlapping 22 British Latin Catholic dioceses, a national coordination council and eight diocesan departments: Liturgy, Finance, Catechism, Faith Formation, Lay Association, Resolution Committee and Youth Association. Its first and present eparch is Joseph Srampickal.

See also 
 List of Catholic dioceses in Great Britain

References

Sources and external links 
 GCatholic.org
 Official site

Syro-Malabar Catholic dioceses
Eastern Catholicism in the United Kingdom
Dioceses in the United Kingdom
Religious organizations established in 2016
Dioceses established in the 21st century
Indian diaspora in the United Kingdom